Browning Nagle (born April 29, 1968) is a retired American football quarterback for the National Football League's New York Jets, Indianapolis Colts, and Atlanta Falcons. He also played as a quarterback for the Arena Football League's Orlando Predators and Buffalo Destroyers.

High school career
Nagle played for Pinellas Park High School, graduating in 1986.

College career
He began his college career at West Virginia the same year as Major Harris. When it became clear that West Virginia would go with Harris and an option offense, Nagle transferred to Louisville and played for Howard Schnellenberger. He was named one of the Most Valuable Players in the 1991 Fiesta Bowl, where he set many passing records, one of which was 451 passing yards vs. the Alabama Crimson Tide.

Professional career
Nagle was drafted by the Jets in the 1991 NFL Draft with the 34th pick overall, one pick after the Atlanta Falcons selected Brett Favre.

References

External links
AFL stats

1968 births
Living people
American football quarterbacks
Players of American football from Philadelphia
Louisville Cardinals football players
New York Jets players
Indianapolis Colts players
Atlanta Falcons players
Orlando Predators players
Buffalo Destroyers players
West Virginia Mountaineers football players